Gonjeshki (also Romanized as Gonjeshkī) is a village in Hayat Davud Rural District, in the Central District of Ganaveh County, Bushehr Province, Iran. At the 2006 census, its population was 50, in 16 families.

References 

Populated places in Ganaveh County